University railway station serves the University of Birmingham, Birmingham Women's Hospital, and the Queen Elizabeth Hospital in the West Midlands of England. It is on the Cross-City Line, which runs from Redditch and Bromsgrove to Lichfield via Birmingham New Street. Most services are operated by West Midlands Railway who manage the station, but some are operated by CrossCountry.

The station is the only main line railway station in Great Britain built specifically to serve a university.

History
Located on the former Birmingham West Suburban Railway, University station was built in 1977–8 to the designs of the architect John Broome as part of the upgrade of the Cross City line. The station was opened by William Rodgers, the Secretary of State for Transport, on 8 May 1978. It is a short distance away from the former Somerset Road station which closed in the 1930s. The station is part built on the site of the ancient Metchley Roman Fort. The Cross-City Line was electrified in 1993 and the current Class 323 electric multiple units were introduced by British Rail on local services.

In 2017, it was announced that University railway station would receive up to £10 million as an improvement fund to enhance passenger experience and reduce overcrowding, as part of the Government's Midlands Engine Strategy.

Facilities
Pedestrian access is via University Road West, close to the Medical School and bus interchange - around  uphill from University Square. Owing to the station's campus location on a service road there is no car parking, although nearby Selly Oak station is a designated Park and Ride station. The station is alongside the Worcester and Birmingham Canal, a popular cycling and jogging route. Access is at street level as there is a fence between Platform 2 and the towpath.

On the concourse are two automated ticket machines  and two windowed ticket booths, staffed all day Monday to Saturday and from 9:20 on Sundays. There is lift access down to both platforms from the entrance. Platform 2 has a covered waiting room. Fare control is enforced by a line of automatic ticket barriers installed in April 2009, as at Five Ways station.

Services
The station is served by West Midlands Railway with local Cross-City Line services operated by 3- or 6-car Class 323 electric multiple units. West Midlands Trains longer-distance services to Hereford and CrossCountry services to Cardiff and Nottingham are operated by air-conditioned Turbostar diesel multiple units.

University station is the seventh busiest station in the Network West Midlands region in terms of passenger numbers, and the busiest without a direct link to London. Just under four million passenger journeys were made to and from the station in the year 2018–19.

The typical off-peak weekday service, in trains per hour (tph) is:

Platform 1 (Northbound) 
All services from Platform 1 stop at Birmingham New Street with an average journey time of 8 minutes.

Services from this platform include : 

 2tph to Four Oaks, calling at all stations.
 2tph to Lichfield Trent Valley, calling at all stations except Duddeston.
 1tph to Birmingham New Street only.
1tph to Nottingham.

Platform 2 (Southbound) 
services from this platform include 
 3tph to Bromsgrove.
3tph to Redditch.
 1tph to Hereford. In the evening rush hour, there are additional trains (1tph) to either Great Malvern or Worcester Shrub Hill.
1tph to Cardiff Central.

Disabled access
There is level access from the street to the ticket office and footbridge. Lifts provide access to both platforms from the footbridge. The station has a wide ticket gate which wheelchair users can use unaided.

Redevelopment 
In July 2019, West Midlands Rail Executive (WMRE) and Transport for West Midlands (TfWM) announced plans to redevelop the station in order to accommodate increasing passenger numbers generally and those arising from the upcoming 2022 Commonwealth Games, of which two events will be held at venues on the University of Birmingham campus. The upgrades are intended to allow the station, originally designed for approximately 500,000 passengers a year, to handle more than 7 million passengers annually.

The plans include:

 construction of a new, larger station building at the north end of the platforms.
 widening of the platforms to alleviate crowding during peak times.
 a footbridge over the canal linking the new station to the university campus.
 a new public space around the approach to the new building.

On 22 July 2020, Minister of State for Transport Chris Heaton-Harris announced £12 million of government funding towards the expected £56 million cost of the project.  The remaining £44 million is to be funded by a consortium comprising the University of Birmingham, Birmingham City Council, Network Rail, West Midlands Trains and the Greater Birmingham and Solihull LEP.

References

External links

Rail Around Birmingham and the West Midlands: University railway station

Railway stations opened by British Rail
Railway stations in Great Britain opened in 1978
Railway stations in Birmingham, West Midlands
DfT Category D stations
Railway stations served by CrossCountry
Railway stations served by West Midlands Trains
University of Birmingham
Edgbaston
Railway stations at university and college campuses
John Broome railway stations